The Ostioneros de Guaymas was a professional baseball club based in Guaymas, a city located in the southwest part of the state of Sonora, Mexico. 

The Ostioneros were one of the four original founding members of the Mexican Pacific Coast League, a minor league circuit that operated in Mexico in the seasons from 1945–46 through 1957–58. The team won pennant titles in the 1947–48 and 1950–51 seasons, managed by Juan Guerrero and Luis Montes de Oca, respectively.

Before the 1958–59 season, the circuit was renamed Sonora Winter League and lasted through the 1991–92 season. This is considered the beginning of the modern era of what is now the Mexican Pacific League. The Guaymas club also competed in this second stage, winning titles in 1958–59 and 1959–60 guided by Manuel Magallón, in 1962–63 and 1964–65 with Guillermo Frayde at the helm, and 1967–68 with Ronaldo Camacho, to won seven league titles in both stints.

The Ostioneros name has since been used by other sport clubs based in Guaymas.

Notable players
Sid Monge
Andrés Mora
Enrique Romo

Sources

Further reading
Bjarkman, Peter (2005). Diamonds around the Globe: The Encyclopedia of International Baseball. Greenwood.

External links
ESPN Deportes

Baseball teams in Mexico
Defunct baseball teams in Mexico
Baseball teams established in 1945
Sports clubs disestablished in 1992